Park Square Bridge, also known as the Supertram Bridge, is a prominent bridge in the City of Sheffield, England. It was constructed in 1993 using a bowstring, or tied arch design. The bridge carries the Sheffield Supertram system from Commercial Street onto the Park Square roundabout.

References

Bridges in Sheffield
Sheffield Supertram
Bridges completed in 1995
Tied arch bridges
Railway bridges in South Yorkshire